Michael Blum may refer to:
 Michael Blum (musician) (born 1993), American jazz musician
 Michael Blum (artist) (born 1966), Israeli artist
 Michael Blum (footballer) (born 1988), German footballer
 Mike Blum (1943–2008), Canadian football player